Marc Ian Twaddle (born 27 August 1986) is a Scottish professional footballer who plays as a left back for Irvine Meadow in the Scottish Junior Football Association, West Region. He has previously played in the Scottish Premier League for Falkirk.

Career
Twaddle, a defender, was previously a youth player at Rangers but failed to make any first team appearances and joined Falkirk in August 2003. The highlight of his Falkirk career was scoring the winner against Rangers – Falkirk's first league win against Rangers in over three decades. He left Falkirk in summer 2007 in search of first team football and joined Partick Thistle. He was much appreciated by the Thistle support due to his exceptionally high work rate, good pace and cultured left foot. He usually plays as a left back, although he has been deployed either as a wing back in a five-man defence or as a left midfielder. He rejoined Falkirk in July 2009 under the former youth team coach, Eddie May.

On 4 July 2011, Twaddle signed for Rochdale on a two-year contract. On 2 July 2012, his contract was cancelled by mutual consent. In August 2012, he moved to Ayr United after signing a contract. Twaddle signed for Junior side Irvine Meadow in August 2013.

External links

References

1986 births
Living people
Scottish footballers
Footballers from Glasgow
Falkirk F.C. players
Rangers F.C. players
Partick Thistle F.C. players
Rochdale A.F.C. players
Ayr United F.C. players
Irvine Meadow XI F.C. players
English Football League players
Scottish Premier League players
Scottish Football League players
Scottish Junior Football Association players
Association football defenders
People educated at Turnbull High School